Atta Kouakou (born 1945) is an Ivorian sprinter. He competed in the men's 4 × 100 metres relay at the 1968 Summer Olympics.

References

1945 births
Living people
Athletes (track and field) at the 1968 Summer Olympics
Ivorian male sprinters
Olympic athletes of Ivory Coast
Place of birth missing (living people)